Cercinitis or Kerkinitis was a lake in ancient Edonis, in the lower valley of the river Strymon. It was located within today's Serres regional unit and is identified with the currently dry Lake Achinos.

According to Arrian, Alexander the Great's fleet was anchored in this lake before sailing to Asia Minor beach. Archaeological findings (stone anchors etc.) and inscriptions show the existence of both sailing on the lake and ancient lakeside settlements near the current villages of Paralimni, Pethelinos, Psychiko, and Mesokomi.

The Strymon River flowed from its estuary to Lake Cercinitis, thus forming a waterway that allowed commercial penetration from the Strymonian Gulf to the hinterland reaching almost to the ancient city of Serres.

References

Landforms of Serres (regional unit)